"Forget Me Not" is a 1968 single by Motown girl group Martha and the Vandellas (credited as Martha Reeves & the Vandellas). Though the song failed to ignite charts in America, barely hitting the Billboard Hot 100, where it peaked at No. 93, (it was the b-side to their hit, "I Promise to Wait My Love") and failing to chart on the US R&B charts (a rarity for the group), it became a hit on the UK Singles Chart singles chart peaking at No. 11 (in March 1971) netting them their biggest UK hit in several years.

Credits
Lead vocals by Martha Reeves
Background vocals by The Andantes: Marlene Barrow, Jackie Hicks and Louvain Demps
Written by Richard Morris and Sylvia Moy
Produced by Richard Morris
Instrumentation by The Funk Brothers

References

1968 singles
Martha and the Vandellas songs
Songs written by Sylvia Moy
Songs written by Richard Morris (songwriter)
Motown singles
1968 songs